Preaek Khpob is a khum (commune) of Aek Phnum District in Battambang Province in north-western Cambodia.

Villages

 Preaek Snao
 Preaek Khpos
 Sna Pi Mukh
 Khvet
 Ou Kambot

References

Communes of Battambang province
Aek Phnum District